Dawn Chorus is the fourth studio album from the American rock band LKFFCT.

Content
The eleven-track album was digitally released by Sniffling Indie Kids, on 6 October 2017. It was produced by LKFFCT, and mixed and mastered by Skylar Ross. The album artwork is by Andrea Aidekman. Dawn Chorus is described as "'60s psychedelic classics [mixed] with punk and indie rock," and draws comparison to the music of the psychedelic rock band Strawberry Alarm Clock, the lo-fi rock band Guided by Voices, the rhythm and blues band the Animals, and the post-punk new wave band the Clash. The album is conceptually about anxiety, politics and society, and pursuing dreams. The band cites musical influence for Dawn Chorus from the rock musician Todd Rungren, and the power pop rock band Big Star, and the album features lap steel guitar, saxophone and trumpet.

On recording for Dawn Chorus, Rauch explains that "we consciously set out to incorporate certain instrumentation that we hadn't previously used before," adding "a big part of what I love about this band is how we always seem to challenge and push each other musically."

Reception
A review by James Damion in Jersey Beat calls Dawn Chorus "warm, uplifting pop rock songs that have staying power that is somewhat of a rarity in a time and place where immediacy and the arrival of the next big thing are far too real." Speak Into My Good Eye's Mike Mehalick describes the album as a "power-pop meets slacker-rock opus." He describes the songs "Hatchling" and "Anesthesia" as "two beautiful guitar-led gems that showcase LKFFCT's brilliant talents and songwriting approach."

Substream Magazine says that "Ayy Lmao" "sees LKFFCT at their absolute best," calling the song "beautiful and breezy, taking influence from the worlds indie rock of the early 2000s and 70s soft rock alike."

Track listing

Personnel
Ryan Baredes – drums and percussion
Brian Legentil – bass
Max Rauch – guitar, vocals and percussion
Keith Williams – guitar and vocals

Additional musicians
James Abbott – guitar and lap steel guitar
Harrison Bieth – saxophone 
Frank DeFranco – guitar 
Ken De Poto – trumpet 
Chris Gennone – vocals 
Elizabeth Lee – vocals 
Evan Luberger – keyboards

References

Citations

Bibliography

2017 albums
Indie rock albums by American artists
LKFFCT albums
Sniffling Indie Kids albums